"Corrupt" is an unproduced episode of the television series Angel. It was originally intended as the second episode of the series, but production was abandoned, and instead "Lonely Heart" was written and produced to replace it.

Behind the scenes

David Fury commented:

"And along those lines the second episode that I'd written called 'Corrupt' - it was pretty much about junkie prostitutes. Not usually what you see on the WB. And Kate, the police woman character on the show... originally was an undercover cop who was addicted to cocaine and was sleeping with men for money, because she got a little bit too far into her undercover work.

Only two days before the episode went into production, shooting was ordered not to start because The WB Network believed that the episode was too dark in tone. The script was largely abandoned although elements of it became "Lonely Heart". Parts of the "Corrupt" script were also reused in later episodes.

Tim Minear said a few words about the unproduced episode:

David Fury, who wrote this episode, had written a script called ‘Corrupt’ in which Kate was a police officer working undercover as a prostitute who was actually becoming a prostitute and was addicted to crack. That was originally the introduction of Kate. "Obviously we were still trying to figure out what the show was at that point. This was the first episode after the pilot, and it was written before the new staff arrived. They just went incredibly dark with this thing and decided at the end of the day that it was a little bit too hopeless, a little too grim. After that episode was written it was actually being prepped when the network, too, had some concerns about it."

"It would seem that this was about the same time that the Internet ran rampant with rumors that the WB had shut down the show for retooling. You can’t really call it a shut down because we hadn’t really started", Minear clarifies. "We just pushed back the shoot date for the first episode a week or two. It’s not like alarms went off and we had to pull plugs on everything. I’ve read on the Internet where people were saying the network freaked, and they told us to shut down, and that’s not true at all. We were still creating what the idea of the show was going to be, and basically we decided to rethink that first episode. The other thing that people don’t realize is that a lot of the other episodes that we’ve done this year were written much earlier and did not change significantly. It was really that first episode where we went back, rethought it, and we were lucky we had the luxury to do that."

See also

Unaired Buffy pilot
Christmas Buffy promo

References

Angel (1999 TV series) episodes
Unaired television episodes